Conte Carlo Biscaretti di Ruffia (24 August 1879 in Torino – 7 September 1959 in Ripafratta, San Giuliano Terme near Pisa) was an Italian artist, industrial designer, journalist and automobile enthusiast.

He was the son of Roberto Biscaretti di Ruffia, a senator who was involved in the establishment of Fiat (1899).  
As a youngster, Carlo assisted to the first Italian automobile race (Torino-Asti-Torino, 1896). In 1898 he started the "Automobile club di Torino" (he would be president until 1948).

Biscaretti di Ruffia got a law degree (1904) and worked a while in Genova for "Filiale di Fabbre e Gagliardi", a bicycle accessory shop, before moving to Rome to run the offices of Carrozzeria Alessio.  Back in his hometown, he established  the "Studio Tecnico Carlo Biscaretti" in via della Rocca 22, Torino.  He was involved in the early Itala 51 vehicles (illustrations), for Michelin and contributed to several motor journals.

He was also involved in the Salone dell'automobile di Torino. He collected vehicles since 1933 and he founded the Museo Nazionale dell'Automobile "Carlo Biscaretti di Ruffia", which was opened 1960 after his death.

Lancia logo 
In February 1899 Vincenzo Lancia was sent to help Carlo Biscaretti di Ruffia, who owned a defective Benz and they quickly became friends. Biscaretti di Ruffia was due to become important in Lancia's history, and is credited for designing the Lancia logo in 1911.

References

Italian draughtsmen
Italian industrial designers
Artists from Turin
1879 births
1959 deaths
Italian collectors